Rhamnus davurica is a species of flowering plant in the buckthorn family known by the common name Dahurian buckthorn. It is native to China, Korea, Mongolia, eastern Siberia, and Japan. It is present in North America as an introduced species.

Description
This plant is similar to common buckthorn, but the stems are more stout and the leaves are longer. In its native range it may be up to 10 meters tall. It may also reach up to 9 meters in cultivation. The oppositely arranged leaves are up to 13 centimeters long by 6 wide in its native range, and usually smaller where it is introduced. The male flowers are just under a centimeter long and the female flowers are slightly smaller. The fruit is a drupe containing two seeds.

In the United States this is an invasive species, growing in woodlands, forests, and other habitat types. In its native China it occurs in wet places, such as the edges of canals.

References

External links
USDA Plants Profile

davurica
Flora of Korea